The 1958 Idaho Vandals football team represented the University of Idaho in the 1958 NCAA University Division football season. The Vandals were led by fifth-year head coach Skip Stahley and were members of the Pacific Coast Conference, which disbanded the following spring. Home games were played on campus at Neale Stadium in Moscow, with one home game in Boise at old Bronco Stadium at Boise Junior College.

The Vandals suffered a fourth straight loss in the Battle of the Palouse with neighbor Washington State, blanked 0–8 at home on  In the rivalry game with Montana at Missoula, the Vandals ran their winning streak over the Grizzlies to seven and retained the Little Brown Stein.

Notable players

Junior Jim Norton of Fullerton, California was a safety and punter for nine seasons with the Houston Oilers; he was the all-time interceptions leader in the American Football League and his #43 was the first retired by the franchise.

Jim Prestel of Indianapolis was a defensive tackle for eight seasons in the NFL, primarily with the expansion Minnesota Vikings. A redshirt junior, he missed most of the previous season due to his mother's terminal illness. Selected in the sixth round of the 1959 NFL Draft, 70th overall, he was granted another year of eligibility and played for Idaho in 1959 and began his pro career with the Cleveland Browns in 1960. Prestel was also a standout player on the Vandal basketball team. He played in his final game at Idaho in the Battle of the Palouse in late October with a broken foot, then was sidelined and missed the basketball season.

Schedule

All-Coast

No Vandals made the All-Coast team, but tackle Pete Johnson was a second team selection.  Honorable mention were tackle Jim Prestel, guard Jim Roussos, and back Bob Dehlinger.

NFL Draft
One senior was selected in the 1959 NFL Draft:

^ Prestel was granted another year of eligibility and played for Idaho in 1959.

Two fifth-year seniors were previously selected in the 1958 NFL Draft:

Two juniors were selected in the 1960 NFL Draft:

List of Idaho Vandals in the NFL Draft

References

External links
Gem of the Mountains: 1959 University of Idaho yearbook – 1958 football season 
Go Mighty Vandals – 1958 football season
Official game program: Idaho at Utah – October 4, 1958
Idaho Argonaut – student newspaper – 1958 editions

Idaho
Idaho Vandals football seasons
Idaho Vandals football